Ghayal may refer to:

 Ghayal (1990 film), an Indian film starring Sunny Deol and Meenakshi Sheshadri
 Ghayal Once Again, a 2016 sequel to the 1990 film starring Sunny Deol

See also
 Gayal, a large domesticated Asian bovine